Leah Howell is an American politician who is currently serving as a member of the Kansas House of Representatives for the 82nd district. A Republican from Sedgwick County, Kansas, Howell was elected by Republican precinct committee members to serve as a temporary replacement for Blake Carpenter in the 81st district, who took a leave of absence during the 2022 legislative session due to military obligations related to his role as an officer in the Kansas Air National Guard.

Howell served the duration of Carpenter's leave of absence, which is expected to last the length of the 2022 legislative session. Carpenter will reassume his legislative duties at the end of his military service. Howell was elected on January 8, 2022, and took office on January 10, 2022, when the legislative session convenes.

In 2022, Howell ran for election in her own right in the 82nd House district, beating Democrat Misti Hobbs by a 65% to 35% margin.

Howell is the wife of Sedgwick County Commissioner Jim Howell, who preceded Carpenter in the Kansas Legislature.

2021–2022 committee assignments:
Federal and State Affairs
Corrections and Juvenile Justice
Elections

References

Living people
Republican Party members of the Kansas House of Representatives
21st-century American politicians
21st-century American women politicians
Women state legislators in Kansas
Spouses of Kansas politicians
Year of birth missing (living people)